Ismael is the second novel by Swedish author Klas Östergren. It was published in 1977.

References

External links

1977 Swedish novels
Novels by Klas Östergren
Swedish-language novels
Novels set in Stockholm
Albert Bonniers Förlag books